Raffan is a surname. Notable people with the surname include:

 Keith Raffan (born 1949), Scottish politician 
 Peter Raffan (1863–1940), British politician
 Richard Raffan (born 1943), Australian woodturner, author, and instructor